John Jay "Jack" Remsen (April, 1850 – After 1884), was an American Major League Baseball player who played mainly in center field for eight teams in nine seasons, from 1872 to 1884.  He played for the Brooklyn Atlantics, New York Mutuals, Hartford Dark Blues, of the National Association; the Dark Blues, St. Louis Brown Stockings, Chicago White Stockings, Cleveland Blues, Philadelphia Quakers of the National League; and the Brooklyn Atlantics of the American Association.

References

External links

1850 births
Major League Baseball center fielders
Baseball players from New York (state)
19th-century baseball players
Philadelphia Quakers players
Brooklyn Atlantics players
Brooklyn Atlantics (AA) players
New York Mutuals players
Hartford Dark Blues players
St. Louis Brown Stockings players
Chicago White Stockings players
Cleveland Blues (NL) players
Sportspeople from Brooklyn
Baseball players from New York City
Utica Pent Ups players
Bay City (minor league baseball) players
Fort Wayne Hoosiers players
Hartford Babies players
Hartford Dark Blues (minor league) players
Buffalo Bisons (minor league) players
Meriden Silvermen players
Mansfield (minor league baseball) players
Ottawa Modocs players
Year of death unknown